The 2017–18 FC Copenhagen season was F.C. Copenhagen's 26th season of existence, competing each year in the Danish Superliga, the top tier of football in Denmark. Outside of the Superliga, Copenhagen competed in the Danish Cup and the UEFA Champions League qualifying rounds.

F.C. Copenhagen had its worst season since the 1999-2000 campaign, finishing fourth in the 2017-18 Danish Superliga and being eliminated in the fourth round of the 2017-18 Danish Cup. 

The Lions fared better in the 2017-18 UEFA Champions League, advancing to the playoff round by defeating MŠK Žilina in the second qualifying round and FK Vardar in the third qualifying round, before seeing their Champions League season end with a loss to Qarabağ FK. 

The playoff loss qualified the team for the 2017-18 UEFA Europa League Group Stage.  Copenhagen finished second in Group F and qualified for the round of 32, where Atlético Madrid prevailed, 5–1.

Kits

Squad

Transfers and loans

Arrivals

Summer

Winter

Departures

Summer

Winter

Loan in

Loan out

Non-competitive

Pre-season Friendlies

Mid-season Friendlies

Competitive

Competition record

Danish Superliga

Regular season

Matches

Championship round
Points and goals carried over in full from the regular season.

Matches

Europa League Playoff

Sydbank Pokalen

Sydbank Pokalen

UEFA Champions League

Second qualifying round

Third qualifying round

Playoff round

UEFA Europa League

Group stage

Round of 32

References

External links
 FC Copenhagen in Danish

F.C. Copenhagen seasons
Danish football clubs 2017–18 season